Lorna Eden is a Fijian politician and former Assistant Minister and Member of the Parliament of Fiji

Eden is a board member of the Fiji Hotel and Tourism Association and owner of the Savusavu Hotsprings hotel.

Eden was elected to Parliament in the 2014 election, in which she won 1,869 votes. She was appointed Assistant Minister for Finance, Public Service, Public Enterprise and Trade and Tourism.  She was not selected by FijiFirst as a candidate for the 2018 election.

References

Ethnic minority members of the Parliament of Fiji
FijiFirst politicians
Government ministers of Fiji
Fijian people of British descent
Politicians from Savusavu
21st-century Fijian women politicians
21st-century Fijian politicians
Women government ministers of Fiji
Year of birth missing (living people)
Living people